The Wargar (Harari: ወርጋር) also spelled as Wergar were a clan inhabiting the Adal region, first mentioned in the fourteenth century chronicles of Emperor Amda Seyon of Ethiopia as allies of Imam Salih. 

In the sixteenth century, the overlord of Zeila Abogn Wargar, accompanied Adal leader Ahmed ibn Ibrahim al-Ghazi during the Ethiopian-Adal War. 

Wargar is described as a Harla sub clan within the Harari people. According to Harari tradition seven clans and villages united against a common adversary including Wargar to form Harar city-state.

See also
 Warjih people, also known as Wargar

References 

Afroasiatic peoples